Itaya amicorum is a medium-size fan palm that is native to Brazil, Colombia and Peru. It is the only species in the genus Itaya. It was unknown to science until 1972, when it was discovered on the bank of the Itaya River in the Peruvian Amazon.

Description
Itaya amicorum is a medium-sized, single-stemmed palm with fan-shaped (or palmate) leaves. The leaves have a whitish or silver-grey underside.

Itaya amicorum is pleonanthic—it flowers repeatedly over the course of its lifespan—and hermaphroditic; both male and female sex organs are present in the same flowers.

Taxonomy

Itaya is a monotypic genus—it includes only a single species, I. amicorum. The species was first collected in 1972 along the Rio Itaya in Peru, and was described by Harold E. Moore the same year. In the first edition of Genera Palmarum (1987), Natalie Uhl and John Dransfield placed the genus Itaya in the subfamily Coryphoideae, the tribe Corypheae and the subtribe Thrinacinae Subsequent phylogenetic analysis showed that the Old World and New World members of the Thrinacinae were not closely related.  As a consequence of this, Itaya and related genera were places in their own tribe, Cryosophileae.

Distribution
Itaya amicorum is found only in the western Amazon basin in Brazil, Colombia and Peru. Originally thought to be endangered due to its narrow distribution, the species is now known to be more widely distributed. The IUCN Red List categorises the species as data deficient.

Uses

The Miraña, an indigenous Amerindian group in the Amazon, reportedly burn the trunks of Itaya amicorum in order to extract salt from them. The leaves are used for thatch.

References

Coryphoideae
Monotypic Arecaceae genera
Flora of Brazil
Flora of Colombia
Flora of Peru
Taxonomy articles created by Polbot